The Andean squirrel (Sciurus pucheranii) is a tree squirrel endemic to Colombia where it inhabits montane rain forest and cloud forests of the Cordillera Occidental and Cordillera Central ranges of the Colombian Andes, at elevations between . It has soft, silky, reddish-brown fur, a darker tail and yellowish-grey underparts. It is thought to be diurnal but has been little studied, and the International Union for Conservation of Nature has rated its conservation status as being data deficient.

Description
The Andean squirrel is a typical tree squirrel, in its general proportions resembling the Eastern grey squirrel of North America. It has soft, silky, reddish-brown fur over most of the body, merging to greyish-yellow on the underparts. The tail fur is darker than that on the body, and some Andean squirrels also have a distinctive dark stripe down their flanks, and/or a black patch on the back of the head. Females have six teats.

Distribution and habitat
As a tree squirrel, it lives among Cecropia trees, palms, and tree ferns. It is believed to be diurnal, but sufficiently little is known about its habits, population, and habitat requirements, that it is currently listed as data deficient by the IUCN.

References

Sciurus
Endemic fauna of Colombia
Mammals of Colombia
Mammals of the Andes
squirrel, Andean
Mammals described in 1867
Taxonomy articles created by Polbot